Bryce Aron Max Harper (born October 16, 1992) is an American professional baseball right fielder and designated hitter for the Philadelphia Phillies of Major League Baseball (MLB). Prior to his arrival in Philadelphia, Harper played for the Washington Nationals from 2012 through 2018. 

One of the most heavily touted draft players in recent history, Harper has been cited as a "five-tool player." He left Las Vegas High School after his sophomore year so that he could attend the College of Southern Nevada, where he won the 2010 Golden Spikes Award. The Nationals selected Harper as the first overall pick in the 2010 MLB draft. He made his MLB debut with the Nationals on April 28, 2012, at 19 years old. Harper was selected for the 2012 All-Star Game, becoming the youngest position player to play in an All-Star Game.

Harper won the National League (NL) Rookie of the Year Award in 2012 and tied for the NL lead in home runs in 2015. He was named the NL Most Valuable Player for 2015 by unanimous decision of the Baseball Writers' Association of America; at age 22, he became the youngest MLB baseball player to win the award. As a free agent during the 2018–19 offseason, he signed a 13-year, $330 million contract with the Phillies, the richest contract in the history of North American sports at the time, until being eclipsed shortly after by Mike Trout. He won his second NL MVP award in 2021 with the Phillies. The next season, he helped lead the Phillies to their first postseason appearance in 11 years, and was instrumental in helping the team win its first pennant since 2009, winning the NLCS MVP in the process.

Early life
Harper attended Las Vegas High School in Las Vegas, Nevada. In May 2009, Sports Illustrated featured Harper in a cover story, comparing him with LeBron James by similarly calling him his sport's "Chosen One".

College career
He earned his GED in October 2009 in his junior year, reclassifying and making him eligible earlier for the Major League Baseball (MLB) draft in June 2010.

For the 2010 college season, 17-year-old Harper enrolled at the College of Southern Nevada of the Scenic West Athletic Conference (SWAC) in the National Junior College Athletic Association (NJCAA), where he was a catcher. His older brother Bryan, who had been his teammate at Las Vegas High School, was one of the Southern Nevada Coyotes' starting pitchers, and the brothers often worked as a battery. An advantage for Harper in his eventual transition to his MLB career was that the SWAC, like MLB, uses wooden bats in conference play. In 66 games, he hit 31 home runs with 98 RBIs, hitting .443 with a .526 OBP, and a .987 SLG. Harper's 31 home runs in 2010 broke the school's previous record of 12, and he was named the 2010 SWAC Player of the Year.

In the Western district finals of the 2010 NJCAA World Series, Harper went 6-for-7 with five RBIs and hit for the cycle. The next day, in a doubleheader, he went 2-for-5 with a three-run double in the first game. In the second game, he went 6-for-6 with four home runs, a triple, and a double.

On June 2 that year, Harper was ejected from a National Junior College World Series game by home plate umpire Don Gilmore for disputing a called third strike. Harper drew a line in the dirt with his bat as he left the plate, presumably to show where he thought the pitch was. It was Harper's second ejection of the year and resulted in a two-game suspension. The suspension ended his amateur career, and Southern Nevada lost the game from which Harper was ejected. With Harper suspended, the team also lost their next game, which eliminated them from the tournament. Harper won the 2010 Golden Spikes Award, given to the best amateur baseball player in the nation.

Professional career

Draft and minor leagues
The Washington Nationals chose Harper with the first overall selection of the 2010 Major League Baseball draft. Although Harper had previously and predominantly played catcher, the Nationals drafted him as an outfielder to extend his career and to accelerate his player development so that he could debut in MLB earlier.

At the signing deadline, Harper and the Nationals agreed to a five-year contract worth $9.9 million, including a $6.25 million signing bonus and eight semesters of college tuition. When asked about the signing, Nationals President Stan Kasten said, "The truth is, with a full minute to go, Mike and I both thought we were not going to have a deal." Asked what changed in that final minute, Nationals General Manager Mike Rizzo replied, "It was both sides compromising and knowing that we were so close, it would be fruitless not to get a deal done." On August 26, 2010, Harper was introduced by the Nationals. He said he chose to wear No. 34 because "I always loved Mickey Mantle, three and four equals seven."

After batting .319 with a .407 OBP (and leading his team in hits, home runs, RBIs, and walks) in the Nationals' fall instructional league, Harper was selected to participate in the Arizona Fall League (AFL) as a member of the Scottsdale Scorpions taxi-squad, the second-youngest player in the history of the league (two days older than when Mets' prospect Fernando Martínez appeared in the league in 2006). He batted .343 and slugged .729. On November 20, Harper and the Scottsdale Scorpions won the 2010 AFL Championship.

After batting .399 in spring training, Harper began his minor league career when the Nationals optioned him to the Hagerstown Suns of the Class-A South Atlantic League. In April 2011, after a slow start in the minor leagues, Harper visited optometrist Dr. Keith Smithson, who reportedly told him, "I don't know how you ever hit before. You have some of the worst eyes I've ever seen." In his first 20 games after receiving contact lenses, Harper hit .480, collecting seven home runs, 10 doubles and 23 RBIs.

Harper was selected to represent the United States in the 2011 All-Star Futures Game during the 2011 All-Star Game weekend. He was promoted to the Harrisburg Senators of the Class AA Eastern League on July 4. Harper went 2-for-3 in his AA debut with two singles, a run, and a walk.

On August 18, 2011, Harper injured his hamstring while running from second to third on an extra-base hit. The injury was severe enough for him to be carried off the field by his coaches. He was placed on the seven-day disabled list and the injury ended Harper's season. Harper began the 2012 season with the Syracuse Chiefs of the Class AAA International League.

Washington Nationals (2012–2018)

2012 season: NL Rookie of the Year

The Nationals promoted Harper to the major leagues on April 27, 2012, after Ryan Zimmerman was placed on the disabled list. He made his MLB debut with the Nationals the next day against the Los Angeles Dodgers. Harper grounded out to pitcher Chad Billingsley in his first major league at-bat. He recorded his first major league hit, a double, in his third at-bat against Billingsley and got his first RBI on a sacrifice fly in the top of the ninth against Javy Guerra.

After being hit by a pitch by Cole Hamels in the first inning of a game against the Phillies on May 6, Harper eventually advanced to third, then stole home plate, becoming the first teenager to steal home plate since 1964. Hamels later admitted that he intentionally hit Harper and was suspended for five games by MLB. On May 14, Harper was 19 when he hit his first career Major League home run, connecting off of San Diego Padres pitcher Tim Stauffer. He was the youngest player to homer in the major leagues since Adrián Beltré did in 1998. He was named National League Rookie of the Month for May.

Harper earned his first walk-off hit on June 5 with an RBI single in the bottom of the 12th inning against the New York Mets.

During a game against the Toronto Blue Jays on June 12, Harper hit a deep home run to center field that struck an advertising banner adjacent to the restaurant in the second tier of seats at the Rogers Centre, estimated to travel 438 feet. After the game, a reporter asked if Harper would take advantage of Ontario's lower drinking age (19, versus 21 in the U.S.) by drinking a celebratory beer with his teammates. Harper replied, "I'm not going to answer that. That's a clown question, bro." The comment quickly developed into an Internet meme, and the phrase itself repeated, in response to a question, by Senate Majority Leader Harry Reid. Harper filed an application to trademark the phrase.

Harper was named a candidate in the All-Star Final Vote, with the winner being added to the All-Star Game roster. Harper finished third behind David Freese and Michael Bourn. However, Bourn would make the roster after Ian Desmond sustained an injury and Harper would become the youngest position player (and third-youngest player, behind Dwight Gooden and Bob Feller) to ever make an All-Star roster when it was announced Giancarlo Stanton would undergo knee surgery. "I don't have words to explain it right now. It's exciting to go. I'm excited to get there and be around all the top guys in the country, of course, and the top guys in baseball. I'm going to take it all in and try to enjoy it with my family and just be as mellow and as calm as I can," Harper stated. He went 0-for-1 with a strikeout and a walk.

Harper struggled in the games following the All-Star break, hitting .176 with 26 strikeouts in his first 116 plate appearances in the second half of the season. Manager Davey Johnson began to give Harper days off due to his poor play and visible on-field frustration. Johnson said that Harper had become "overly aggressive" at the plate.

Harper's play began to improve in late August. He hit two home runs in a game against the Miami Marlins on August 29, his first career multi-homer game, and received his first major league ejection after throwing his helmet down in the ninth inning in response to hitting into a double play. He had a second multi-homer game on September 5, against the Chicago Cubs. Harper was named Rookie of the Month again in September after hitting .330 with seven home runs. Harper's 254 total bases and 57 extra base hits were the most ever for a player under age 20, while his 22 home runs, 98 runs scored, .340 on-base percentage, .477 slugging percentage, and .817 on base-plus-slugging were the best regular season totals for a teenager in the past 45 years.

In Game 5 of the 2012 NLDS against the St. Louis Cardinals, Harper hit his first postseason home run. The Nationals would eventually lose the game 7–9 despite leading by 6 runs. He finished his first postseason appearance with a .130 batting average.

Harper was named the National League Rookie of the Year. He received 112 votes, 16 of them first-place votes, beating Arizona's Wade Miley (105 votes, 12 first-place) and Cincinnati's Todd Frazier.

2013 season
Harper hit two home runs against the Miami Marlins on Opening Day of the 2013 season. At age 20, he became the youngest major league player to hit two home runs in his team's first game of the season. He was voted a starter for the MLB All-Star Game, his second career All-Star selection.

After hitting 13 home runs in just 58 games, Harper was selected to participate in the 2013 Home Run Derby. Harper hit a total of 16 home runs in the first two rounds to advance to the final round, in which he faced Yoenis Céspedes, an outfielder for the Oakland Athletics. Although he lost 9–8 in the finals, Harper was the second-youngest player to participate in the Home Run Derby, and the youngest to ever make it to the final round. Harper hit his 17th homer of the season on August 6, the 39th of his career, passing Ken Griffey Jr. for most home runs by a player younger than 21. Only two other players hit more home runs than Harper before turning 21. In 118 games, he hit .274/.368/.486 with 20 home runs, 58 RBIs, and 47 extra base hits. During the 2013 off-season, Harper successfully underwent left knee surgery to remove a bursa sac.

2014 season
During a game against the San Diego Padres on April 25, 2014, Harper suffered a left thumb injury when he slid into third base on a 3-run triple. He was placed on the 15-day disabled list the next day. An MRI revealed that the thumb had a torn ulnar collateral ligament. On April 28, it was announced that Harper would require surgery to repair the ligament tear in the thumb. During a rehab game with the Double-A Harrisburg Senators on June 28, Harper hit 3 home runs in a single game. Harper returned to the Majors on June 30. In 100 games during the season, Harper batted .273 with 13 home runs and 32 RBI.

After the 2014 season, Harper planned to travel to Japan to participate in the 2014 Major League Baseball Japan All-Star Series, but later withdrew.

2015 season: First NL MVP

On April 18, 2015, Harper hit the longest home run of his MLB career with a 461-foot drive over the center field wall against the Philadelphia Phillies. On May 6, Harper hit three home runs in a single game for the first time in his career. He did it against Tom Koehler, with one of the shots going 442 feet to the second deck in a 7–5 victory over the Miami Marlins. He became the youngest player to accomplish this feat since Joe Lahoud in 1969. Harper was later awarded the Player of the Month Award for May for the first time in his career.

Measured by adjusted OPS (OPS+), Harper's 2015 was a top-5 hitting season (since 1900) for all players under the age of 23, and the best season of any hitter since Barry Bonds a decade earlier. He also led the majors in WAR and tied for the NL home run title with 42. Harper also became the youngest player ever with at least 40 home runs and 120 walks in one season, a distinction previously held by Babe Ruth.

Baseball America named Bryce the 2015 player of the year. On October 31, Harper was named the National League winner of the 2015 Hank Aaron Award. On November 19, Harper was selected as the 2015 National League Most Valuable Player by unanimous decision. With his MVP win at age 23, Harper became the youngest player to unanimously win the award. Harper also became the first player in Nationals/Expos history to win an MVP award and the first player that played for a Washington team to win one. ESPN chose him as their 2015 MLB Person of the Year.

2016 season
On April 14, 2016, Harper hit his first career grand slam for his 100th career home run in a game against the Atlanta Braves. Three days later, he hit a home run for a fourth straight game, setting a new career streak for most consecutive games with a home run. He was named National League Player of the Week on April 18, after driving in 12 runs, tying a club record for home runs in consecutive games and becoming the eighth-youngest player in major league history to reach 100 home runs.

On May 8, Harper was walked six times in a game against the Chicago Cubs, tying the MLB record for most walks in a game. Harper also reached base seven times (besides the six walks he was also hit by a pitch), becoming the first player in over 100 years to reach base seven times without recording an at-bat. In total, Harper was walked 13 times in the four-game series, setting a new MLB record for most walks in a series. On May 9, Harper was ejected from the dugout for yelling at home plate umpire Brian Knight when teammate Danny Espinosa was called out on strikes. Harper returned to the field to celebrate the win with his teammates and was caught shouting profanity towards Knight. Two days later, Harper was given a one-game suspension and an undisclosed fine, but Harper appealed the same day. On May 14, Harper dropped his appeal and began serving the one-game suspension. In 147 games of 2016, Harper finished with a .243 batting average, 24 home runs, and 86 RBI. He also walked 108 times, and 20 of them were intentional that led MLB.

The Nationals finished the season with a 95–67 record, clinching the NL East division, but lost to the Dodgers in the 2016 NLDS.

2017 season
On Opening Day, April 3, 2017, Harper hit a solo home run, struck out, and walked against the Miami Marlins. His home run was the fifth of his career in a season opener, the most by a player younger than 25. He set the MLB record for runs scored in the month of April with 32, surpassing Larry Walker's 29 in 1997.

On May 13, Harper and the Nationals avoided arbitration in 2018 by agreeing to a one-year, $21.625-million contract. That night, he hit a walk-off home run versus the Philadelphia Phillies for the second time in the 2017 season, after doing it on April 16 as well.

On May 16, Harper hit a home run at PNC Park, which meant in his career he had hit a home run in all 15 National League ballparks.

On May 29, in a game against the San Francisco Giants, Harper was hit by a pitch from Hunter Strickland. Harper had hit two home runs off of Strickland in the 2014 National League Division Series (a series the Giants won), leading Harper to believe Strickland was seeking revenge. Harper slammed down his bat and charged the mound, throwing his helmet wide of Strickland before the two players exchanged punches, starting a bench-clearing brawl in which Giants first baseman Michael Morse, one of several former Nationals teammates of Harper on the Giants team, suffered a serious concussion in a collision with Giants pitcher Jeff Samardzija, which would go on to end his career. Both Harper and Strickland were ejected for their roles in the brawl. The next day, on May 30, Harper was suspended four games. Harper appealed, and his suspension was reduced to three games. Harper credited Morse with preventing him from injury during the scrum, as Morse had absorbed a body blow from Samardzija that appeared to be aimed at Harper, telling a MASN reporter, "I'm very thankful for Mikey Mo."

Harper was the top overall vote-getter for the National League to start in the 2017 Major League Baseball All-Star Game and received the most votes of any one player overall. As the starting right fielder for the National League All-Stars, he went 1-for-1 with a walk and made a diving catch to rob American League catcher Salvador Pérez of a base hit. He wore cleats for the All-Star Game in honor of the late Miami Marlins ace José Fernández, a division rival pitcher who had held Harper to a career .211 batting average against him; Fernández had been killed in a September 2016 boat crash.

On July 27, Harper hit one of four consecutive home runs by Nationals hitters off Milwaukee Brewers starter Michael Blazek; this was the first time that the feat had been accomplished in Major League Baseball since the 2011 season. On August 7, he hit his 150th home run. He was 24 years and 295 days old when he accomplished this feat, exactly the same age as Los Angeles Angels superstar Mike Trout when he hit his 150th home run. On August 12, Harper suffered a hyperextended left knee after reaching first base; the injury forced him to leave the game. It was later revealed that his left knee had a significant bone bruise, but no ligament damage, sending him to the disabled list but prompting team officials to say they were confident he could return before the end of the season. On September 27, Bryce was reactivated off of the DL against the Philadelphia Phillies.
On October 13, Harper went 2–4 with an RBI in Game 5 of the NLDS, and made the last out of the game by striking out against Chicago Cubs' closer, Wade Davis, ending the Nationals' NLCS bid.

2018 season
Harper began the 2018 season by drawing more walks than in previous years. He was batting .219 with 21 home runs and 50 RBIs when he was named a starting outfielder for the 2018 MLB All-Star Game, where he also won the homerun derby. He finished the season with a career-high 130 walks, 34 home runs, a .249 batting average, and 100 RBIs, marking his first season reaching triple-digit RBIs. He became a free agent after the 2018 season.

Philadelphia Phillies (2019–present)

On March 2, 2019, Harper signed a 13-year, $330 million contract with the Philadelphia Phillies. This deal set the record for the largest MLB contract until Mike Trout signed a 12-year, $430 million contract extension with the Los Angeles Angels.  Harper chose to wear No. 3 with the club, as the number he wore with the Nationals (34) was being considered for retirement by the Phillies in honor of the late Roy Halladay. At his first press conference, Harper misspoke saying "We want to bring a title back to D.C." The Nationals ended up winning the 2019 World Series in Harper's absence.

2019 season
Harper's first hit as a member of the Phillies was a 465-foot home run to the second deck of the right field bleachers at Citizens Bank Park on March 30, 2019, off Jesse Biddle of the Atlanta Braves. On August 15, 2019, Harper hit a walk-off grand slam against the Chicago Cubs. On September 3, 2019, Harper would bat his 100th RBI of the season for the second consecutive year and was the first Philadelphia Phillies player since Ryan Howard in 2011 to hit for 100 RBIs or more in a season. However, the Phillies missed the playoffs, being eliminated officially on September 24 by losing to the eventual World Series champions and Harper's former team, the Washington Nationals.

2020 season
In March 2020, the Major League Baseball season was suspended indefinitely due to the COVID-19 pandemic. On May 15, Harper took to Instagram and suggested a potential 135-game season that would last from July through November. Major League Baseball eventually settled on a 60-game season that began on July 24. Harper hit .268/.420/.542 with 13 home runs and 33 RBIs and led the majors with 49 walks during the season.

2021 season: Second NL MVP
In 2021, Harper batted .309/.429/.615 with 35 home runs and 84 RBIs in 141 games. His slugging percentage led the major leagues. He also led the National League with 78 extra-base hits and tied for the major league lead with 42 doubles. He won his second career National League MVP award. He is the second player in Major League history to win a league MVP with two different teams before the age of 30, joining Barry Bonds.

2022 season: NLCS MVP and first World Series appearance
On May 12, Harper was diagnosed with a small tear in the ulnar collateral ligament of his right elbow. He received a platelet-rich plasma injection to alleviate the pain on May 15, but was not allowed to throw in the outfield for at least six weeks. He was used exclusively as a designated hitter to avoid further damage. While playing against the San Diego Padres on June 25, Harper was hit by a pitch from Blake Snell. In the aftermath, Harper suffered a fractured left thumb and ruled out indefinitely. He underwent surgery on his thumb on July 6 with three pins being inserted to stabilize the area.

In August, Harper was designated to the Lehigh Valley IronPigs in Allentown, the Phillies' Triple-A affiliate, as a final step in his rehabilitation stint from his thumb fracture in June. IronPigs' fans in Allentown greeted Harper's appearance enthusiastically, and Coca-Cola Park quickly sold out to its 10,100 capacity for Harper's appearance against the Gwinnett Stripers. In his August 23 appearance with the IronPigs, Harper homered twice. The Phillies surged in the second half to reach the playoffs, their first appearance since 2011. 

In the 2022 regular season, Harper batted .286/.364/.514 in 370 at bats, with 63 runs, 18 home runs, 65 RBIs, 7 sacrifice flies (6th in the NL), and 9 intentional walks (9th), as he had the 9th-highest salary in baseball ($27.5 million). He played 90 games at DH, and eight games in right field.

In Harper's first postseason series since 2017, he hit a home run in Game 2 of the NL Wild Card Series vs St. Louis in an eventual 2–0 victory. With their advancement to the NLDS, Harper finally won a postseason series. He batted 8 for 16 in the NLDS against the defending champion Atlanta Braves; helping the Phillies win the series 3–1 and advance to the NLCS for the first time since 2010.

On October 23, 2022 during game 5 of the National League Championship Series, Harper hit a go-ahead 2-run home run in the bottom of the 8th inning off of Padres right-handed reliever Robert Suárez. It would prove to be the game-winning hit, sending the Phillies to the 2022 World Series against the Houston Astros. At the end of the game, Harper was voted 2022 NLCS MVP.

During his first World Series, Harper went 4 for 20 at bats, scoring a run each in Games 1 and 3. Most notably, in Game 3, Harper hit the first of five homers from the Phillies against Lance McCullers, Jr., with the game tying the record for most home runs from a single team in one World Series game. The Phillies would lose against the Astros four games to two. On November 23, 2022, it was announced that Harper underwent Tommy John surgery and would miss a portion of the 2023 season, with the expectation he could return as the Phillies' everyday designated hitter at around the All-Star break.

International career 
Harper played for the United States U-18 baseball team in 2008 and 2009, before he was drafted by the Nationals.

On August 12, 2022, Harper announced that he would join the United States national baseball team in the 2023 World Baseball Classic, joining fellow Phillie J. T. Realmuto.

Career accomplishments

 2× NL Most Valuable Player (2015, 2021)
 7× MLB All-Star selection (2012, 2013, 2015, 2016, 2017, 2018, 2022)
 National League Rookie of the Year (2012)
 2× NL Hank Aaron Award (2015, 2021)
 Silver Slugger Award (2015, 2021)
 NLCS MVP (2022)
 ESPN MLB Person of the Year (2015)
 All-Star Futures Game selection (2011)
 Golden Spikes Award (2010)
 SWAC Player of the Year (2010)
 Baseball America High School Player of the Year (2009)

Personal life
Harper resides in Henderson, Nevada, during the off-season. His father, Ron, is an ironworker in Las Vegas and his mother is Sherilyn Harper. Harper attributes his work ethic to the lessons he learned from watching his father: "I wanted to come out and I wanted to work hard because he worked hard. He did it for over 25 years." Harper's older brother, Bryan, also played in the Washington Nationals organization. While playing on different teams within the Nationals organization, the Harper brothers spoke by phone "almost every day" during the baseball season, according to Bryce. When he was a youth in Las Vegas, he also played alongside Joey Gallo and Kris Bryant.

Harper is a member of the Church of Jesus Christ of Latter-day Saints. He has spoken publicly about his decision to abstain from alcohol. In 2014, he said that he sometimes drinks coffee during the baseball season. Though serving a mission is strongly encouraged for male members of The Church of Jesus Christ of Latter-day Saints who are between the ages of 18 and 26, it is not required. Harper decided his mission rested on the diamond. In a 2016 interview, he said, "Coming up to the draft and trying to make that decision, I always thought that my Heavenly Father upstairs always just wanted me to be a walking Book of Mormon, you could say," [...] "I knew that I could touch a lot of people's lives playing and trying to be the best Mormon that I can be on and off the field."

Harper and his girlfriend Kayla Varner were engaged in 2014, but their wedding that was set for January 2015 did not take place. In July 2016, Kayla announced the couple's reconciliation and re-engagement. They were married at the San Diego California Temple in December 2016. Their first child, a son, was born in Las Vegas on August 22, 2019, while Harper was with his wife on paternity leave. Their second child, a daughter, was born in November 2020.

In 2018, the Washington Nationals Dream Foundation and the District of Columbia Department of Parks and Recreation renovated a baseball field in the Takoma neighborhood of Washington, D.C. and named it Bryce Harper Field.

Harper is a fan of the Vegas Golden Knights of the NHL. He dropped the puck before a game in their inaugural season and put the Golden Knights' logo on his bat during their run to the Stanley Cup Finals in 2018. After his first son's birth, the Vegas Golden Knights gifted him a personalized jersey.

Endorsements and other media appearances
Harper was featured in an episode of ESPN E:60. He was featured naked in ESPN's The Magazine 2015 Body Issue. Harper has appeared on The Tonight Show Starring Jimmy Fallon on two occasions, the first in 2016 to play Catch Phrase with Fallon, Andy Samberg and Gigi Hadid, and the second in 2019 to play the video game MLB The Show 19 with Fallon, the latter of which featured Harper as the cover athlete. In 2016, Harper signed a 10-year extension with apparel company Under Armour, at the time the largest endorsement deal in history for a baseball player.

See also

 List of largest sports contracts
 List of Major League Baseball annual doubles leaders
 List of Major League Baseball annual runs scored leaders
 List of Major League Baseball career games played as a right fielder leaders
 List of Major League Baseball career OPS leaders
 List of Major League Baseball career slugging percentage leaders
 List of National League annual slugging percentage leaders
 List of people from Las Vegas
 List of Philadelphia Phillies award winners and league leaders
 List of Washington Nationals team records

References

External links

Bryce Harper at SABR (Baseball BioProject)
Bryce Harper at Baseball Almanac
Bryce Harper  at Baseball Gauge

1992 births
Living people
Baseball players from Nevada
Hagerstown Suns players
Harrisburg Senators players
Latter Day Saints from Nevada
Major League Baseball right fielders
Major League Baseball Rookie of the Year Award winners
National League All-Stars
National League Championship Series MVPs
National League home run champions
National League Most Valuable Player Award winners
Philadelphia Phillies players
Potomac Nationals players
Scottsdale Scorpions players
Silver Slugger Award winners
Southern Nevada Coyotes baseball players
Sportspeople from Las Vegas
Syracuse Chiefs players
Washington Nationals players
Las Vegas High School alumni
Twitch (service) streamers